Bulbophyllum aemulum is a species of orchid in the genus Bulbophyllum. It is native to Papua New Guinea.

References

The Bulbophyllum-Checklist
The Internet Orchid Species Photo Encyclopedia

aemulum
Plants described in 1905